Leonhard Haas (born 19 January 1982, in Rosenheim) is a German retired footballer.

References

External links
 

1982 births
Living people
German footballers
Germany youth international footballers
FC Bayern Munich II players
Hamburger SV players
Hamburger SV II players
FC Augsburg players
SpVgg Greuther Fürth players
FC Ingolstadt 04 players
FC Hansa Rostock players
2. Bundesliga players
3. Liga players
Association football midfielders
People from Rosenheim
Sportspeople from Upper Bavaria
Footballers from Bavaria